The Magic Box is a 1951 British Technicolor biographical drama film directed by John Boulting. The film stars Robert Donat as William Friese-Greene, with numerous cameo appearances by performers such as Peter Ustinov and Laurence Olivier. It was produced by Ronald Neame and distributed by British Lion Film Corporation. 

The film was a project of the Festival of Britain and adapted by Eric Ambler from the controversial biography by Ray Allister.

This biographical drama gives an account of William Friese-Greene, who designed and patented one of the earliest working cinematic cameras. Told in flashback, the film follows Friese-Greene's obsessional pursuit of recording the "moving image", to the neglect of his financial situation, and the problems this causes in his two marriages.

Plot 
The first section of the film is told from the perspective of Mrs Friese-Green telling the story of how she met Willie to a friend. They marry and have four sons but are in constant financial difficulties due to his experiments to create colour film. The three oldest boys lie about their age in order to enlist in the army in the First World War. His wife leaves him due to the stress.

Coming out of her flashback, back in 1921, William Friese-Greene, is still in dire financial straits, he attends a film conference in London. He is saddened that all those attending are businessmen interested only in moneymaking. He attempts to speak, but no-one is interested and he sits down. He thinks back to his early pioneering days and a longer flashback begins.

Young "Willie" works as an assistant to photographer Maurice Guttenberg, who will not let him take portraits his way. After an argument with Guttenberg he leaves and, with his new wife, a client of his former employer, he opens a studio. After a slow start, he does well and opens other studios, but he is more interested in developing moving pictures and colour films.

He goes to visit Fox Talbot on the same day he is meant to sing a solo within a choir with his wife. He forgets to go and she has to sing his part, but he is delighted with his meeting with Talbot. They move to London. Although he is a successful photographer he sidetracks this profitable work for his costly experiments in creating celluloid film. He is in partnership with Mr Collings who initially has faith in him but as a businessman is eventually forced to break the partnership. He mortgages his house to raise money.

One Sunday he lies to his wife and excuses himself from church and instead meets a relative and his son in Hyde Park. He films them approaching on his new camera and tripod and asks them to help carry the tripod to the parade. At night he starts to develop the first film. He waits patiently. The clock strikes 3 a.m. The film develops and he puts it in his projector, hardly daring to look. We see the flicker of light on his face.

Excited, he rushes out and drags in a passing policeman (Laurence Olivier credited as Larry Oliver), he says "it is almost as if he was alive". The policeman gets worried and draws his truncheon. He asks the policeman to witness the success of the film. The policeman is dumbfounded, not quite comprehending what he has just seen. Willie explains he is seeing eight pictures per second and it looks like movement.

He tells his wife they will be millionaires. Instead we see him in the bankruptcy court. His wife collapses in a side office. The doctor says she has a heart condition and recommends a year in bed. She tears up the list of expensive medicines on her journey home. She tells Willie she has sold jewellery to allow him to rent a new studio. It is his birthday, he has forgotten, but she gives him a prism as a present and he is delighted. The story then ends flashback.

Back at the conference, Friese-Greene again stands up to speak, clutching a reel of film. He  states how film has become a "universal language" but becomes incoherent and is forced to sit down. He collapses. A doctor is called, but it is too late. Examining the contents of his pockets in an attempt to identify him, the doctor comments that all the money he could find was just enough for a ticket to the cinema.

Cast

Cameos

Production
Half the budget was provided by the National Film Finance Corporation (NFFC). The film was made by Festival Film Productions, a semi co operative to which all major British film companies contributed their services either free or on a reduced rate basis.

Release  and reception
The film was completed and shown just before the end of the 1951 Festival of Britain, but it did not enter general release until 1952.

In The New York Times, Bosley Crowther wrote: "it seems to have no ground beneath it—no association with historic events—and it turns out to be, in large measure, just a handsome exercise in pathos and sentiment. That doesn't say, however, that it is not expertly done and that it doesn't deserve the attention of all who are interested in the craft of the screen. In the principal role, Robert Donat does a superlative job of conveying both the vigor of a young man and the fragile dignity of old age—a role highly reminiscent of his unforgettable 'Mr. Chips'. As his two wives, Margaret Johnston and Maria  are excellent, and a host of the best British performers are all fine in smaller roles. An idea of the extravagance may be had in the fact that the distinguished Laurence Olivier plays a policeman "bit." While Eric Ambler's script, based on a biography of Friese-Greene by Ray Allister, is understandably vague and extended, it is quaintly eventful and literate, and John Boulting's direction is finished and polished to the nines. Excellent color (by Technicolor) and superb setting and costuming all around add to the lustre of a picture that has everything but a major theme."

Box office
The film was a major financial failure.

Nominations 
The film was nominated for two BAFTA Awards in 1952—BAFTA Award for Best Film and BAFTA Award for Best British Film.

References

Further reading

External links 
 
 
 
 William Friese-Greene & Me – Research on William Friese-Greene

1951 films
1950s biographical drama films
1950s historical drama films
British historical drama films
British biographical drama films
British black-and-white films
1950s English-language films
Films about filmmaking
Films about technology
Films set in the 1870s
Films set in the 1880s
Films set in the 1890s
Films set in the 1900s
Films set in the 1910s
Films set in 1921
Films shot at Associated British Studios
Films directed by John Boulting
Films produced by Ronald Neame
Films scored by William Alwyn
1951 drama films
1950s British films